Edgar S. Hickey (December 20, 1902 – December 5, 1980) was an American college basketball and college football coach. He coached basketball at his alma mater of Creighton University (1935–1943, 1946–1947), St. Louis University (1947–1958) and Marquette University (1958–1964), compiling a 429–230 record. Hickey also served as the head football coach at Creighton in 1934, tallying a mark of 2–7. After retiring from coaching, Hickey managed the American Automobile Association headquarters in Terre Haute, Indiana. He was inducted into the Naismith Memorial Basketball Hall of Fame in 1979 and the National Collegiate Basketball Hall of Fame in 2006. Hickey died of a heart attack on December 5, 1980 in Mesa, Arizona.

Head coaching record

Basketball

Football

References

External links
 

1902 births
1980 deaths
American men's basketball coaches
American men's basketball players
Basketball coaches from Nebraska
Basketball players from Nebraska
College men's basketball head coaches in the United States
Creighton Bluejays football coaches
Creighton Bluejays men's basketball coaches
Creighton Bluejays men's basketball players
High school basketball coaches in the United States
Marquette Golden Eagles athletic directors
Marquette Golden Eagles men's basketball coaches
Naismith Memorial Basketball Hall of Fame inductees
National Collegiate Basketball Hall of Fame inductees
People from Jefferson County, Nebraska
Saint Louis Billikens men's basketball coaches